Fu Haitao (born 13 January 1993) is a Chinese track and field athlete who competes in the triple jump. Fu was the gold medallist at the 2013 East Asian Games and the Asian Indoor Athletics Championships in 2014. He also finished in the top two at the 2010 Youth Olympics and the 2012 Asian Junior Athletics Championships.

Career
He cleared sixteen metres in the triple jump for the first time in 2009, en route to winning the Chinese High School Games title.

He competed only nationally in 2011 and he competed a long/triple jump double at the Chinese junior championships. His best performances came at the Chinese City Games, where he cleared  to take bronze in the long jump and leaped  to win the triple jump title – the latter mark ranked him third in the world that year among junior athletes. He was among the top qualifiers at the 2012 World Junior Championships in Athletics, but managed only seventh place in the final.

Fu took his first senior medals in 2013, first a triple jump bronze medal at the 12th National Games of China, then a gold medal at the 2013 East Asian Games, where he defeated the reigning Asian champion Cao Shuo.

References

External links
 
 

Living people
1993 births
Chinese male triple jumpers
Chinese male long jumpers
Athletes from Fujian
Athletes (track and field) at the 2010 Summer Youth Olympics
21st-century Chinese people